Eupithecia indistincta is a moth in the family Geometridae first described by Taylor in 1910. It is found in North America in Quebec and throughout the northern Atlantic states (including Vermont, Maine, Maryland, North Carolina and West Virginia). It has also been recorded from California.

The wings are chocolate brown. Adults have been recorded on wing from May to August.

References

Moths described in 1910
indistincta
Moths of North America